William Kling  (1867–1934) was an American professional baseball player who played from 1891 to 1895.

His brother, Johnny Kling, also played professional baseball.

External links

1867 births
1934 deaths
Major League Baseball pitchers
Baseball players from Missouri
Baltimore Orioles (NL) players
Philadelphia Phillies players
Louisville Colonels players
19th-century baseball players
St. Paul Apostles players
Rockford Hustlers players
Atlanta Atlantas players
Mobile Bluebirds players
St. Joseph Saints players
Kansas City Cowboys (minor league) players
Kansas City Blues (baseball) players
Rockford Forest Citys (minor league) players